William Allan Smith-Masters, born William Allan Cowburn (13 March 1850 – 27 August 1937) was an English cricketer.  Smith-Masters batting and bowling styles are unknown.  He was born in Humber, Herefordshire.

Smith-Masters made a single first-class appearance for Kent in 1875 against Hampshire at the Winchester College Ground, Winchester.  In his only first-class innings, Smith-Masters scored 7 runs.

He died in Meopham, Kent on 27 August 1937.

Family
Smith-Masters had a distinguished extended family.  His brother-in-law, Spencer Gore, played first-class cricket for Surrey, as well as being the first champion of the Wimbledon Championships.  His other brother-in-law, Fleetwood Edwards, was Keeper of the Privy Purse to Queen Victoria.  He too played first-class cricket, in one match for I Zingari.  His father, Allan Cowburn, played first-class cricket for Oxford University.

References

External links

1850 births
1937 deaths
People from Leominster
Sportspeople from Herefordshire
English cricketers
Kent cricketers